Julián Marchioni (born 11 March 1993) is an Argentine professional footballer who plays as a midfielder for Romanian  Liga II club Politehnica Iași.

References

External links
 

1993 births
Living people
Argentine footballers
Argentine expatriate footballers
Association football defenders
Estudiantes de La Plata footballers
Club Atlético Patronato footballers
FC Den Bosch players
Independiente Rivadavia footballers
Panserraikos F.C. players
FC Politehnica Iași (2010) players
Argentine Primera División players
Primera Nacional players
Eerste Divisie players
Liga II players
Argentine expatriate sportspeople in the Netherlands
Expatriate footballers in the Netherlands
Footballers from La Plata